Richard Jones  (1878 – 1938) was a Welsh international footballer. He was part of the Wales national football team, playing 2 matches. He played his first match on 3 February 1900 against Scotland and his last match on 24 February 1900 against Ireland. At club level, he played for Druids.

See also
 List of Wales international footballers (alphabetical)

References

1878 births
1938 deaths
Welsh footballers
Wales international footballers
Druids F.C. players
Place of birth missing
Date of death missing
Association footballers not categorized by position